Ekerem, is a small populated place in Balkan Province in western Turkmenistan on the Caspian Sea coast.  It is the site of one of Turkmenistan's three oil loading terminals for seaborne shipment of liquid petroleum products.

See also 
 Balkan Province
 List of cities, towns and villages in Turkmenistan

References

Populated places in Balkan Region
Populated coastal places in Turkmenistan